Blake of Scotland Yard may refer to:

 Blake of Scotland Yard (1927 serial), a Universal film serial directed by Robert F. Hill
 Blake of Scotland Yard (1937 serial), a Victory Pictures film serial directed by Robert F. Hill
 Blake of Scotland Yard (1937 film), directed by Robert F. Hill